Vadtal Swaminarayan railway station is a railway station on the Western Railway network in the state of Gujarat. It serves Vadtal town. Passenger trains start from here.

Vadtal is the pilgrim centre of Swaminarayan Sampraday and well known for Swaminarayan Mandir, Vadtal.

Trains

Following trains start from Vadtal Swaminarayan railway station:

 79465/66 Vadtal – Anand DEMU
 79467/68 Vadtal – Anand DEMU

References

Railway stations in Kheda district
Vadodara railway division